Weldon Kern (April 30, 1923 – April 21, 2014) was an American basketball player.  He won two national championships at Oklahoma A&M University and was later an early professional in the Professional Basketball League of America.

Kern, a 5'10 guard from Lawton, Oklahoma, attended Oklahoma A&M from 1944–46, winning championships as a starting forward for the Aggies in both 1945 and 1946 with future Hall of Fame teammate Bob Kurland.  Kern was named first team All-Missouri Valley Conference in 1946, in a year when all five Aggie starters composed the all-conference first team.

Following the completion of his collegiate career, Kern signed with the Oklahoma City Drillers in the Professional Basketball League of America, a short-lived predecessor to the National Basketball Association.

Kern died on April 21, 2014 at the age of 90.

References

1923 births
2014 deaths
Basketball players from Oklahoma
Cameron Aggies men's basketball players
Guards (basketball)
Junior college men's basketball players in the United States
Oklahoma State Cowboys basketball players
People from Shawnee, Kansas
Professional Basketball League of America players
Sportspeople from Lawton, Oklahoma
American men's basketball players